Peter Nehr (born June 29, 1952) is an Austrian-born American politician and  former Republican member of the Florida House of Representatives who represented the 48th District of Florida from 2006 to 2012.

Biography

Personal life
Peter Nehr was born in Kapfenberg, Austria, on June 29, 1952, and began his education at the St. Petersburg Junior College, now known as St. Petersburg College. He completed a Bachelor of Science Degree in Political Science at the University of South Florida.

He owned a flag shop in Tarpon Springs, Florida, but filed for personal bankruptcy, facing a more than $300,000 cash shortfall.

In the spring of 2011, Nehr chose to close Fun City Sweepstakes in Palm Harbor, which he owned, after the Pinellas County Sheriff threatened to shut it down as a gambling establishment.

Political career
Beginning in 2002, Nehr served two terms as City Commissioner for the city of Tarpon Springs, Florida, and on the Board of Directors of the Tarpon Springs Historical Society.  He is also on the Board of the local  Rotary Club. He was the organizer of Tarpon Springs' first Military Appreciation Day Parade.  He served also as a Guardian ad litem in the State of Florida in Pinellas County.

In the 2006 election, Nehr narrowly defeated Countryside High School teacher Carl Zimmerman to become the Florida State House representative for District 48.  During the 2007 session, he served on the Committee on Ethics & Elections, where he was vice chair. He won re-election to the Florida House on November 4, 2008 again by a narrow margin (51% to 49%) over Zimmerman. He was re-elected in 2010, defeating challenger Tom McKone, with 61.5% of the vote.  In 2012, the district was renumbered as the 65th district; Nehr narrowly lost to Zimmerman, 54%-49%.

In 2014, Nehr was an unsuccessful candidate for a seat on the Pinellas County Commission; he finished second of seven candidates in the Republican Primary election, with 22% of the vote.

Philosophical or political views
VoteSmart compiled Nehr's ratings by various groups. In 2008, he rated "100" compared with the position of the Associated Builders and Contractors. He was rated in the 90s with Associated Industries of Florida and the Florida Chamber of Commerce. In  2007, the Christian Coalition of Florida gave him a rating in the 50s., in 2008 in the 70s.

According to his campaign site, Nehr supported the "Homeowner's Insurance Bill of Rights",  legislation mandating lower insurance premiums for those made improvements to their homes to strengthen them against tropical storms and sought lower insurance rates. He believes health care should be reasonably affordable and of high quality. He also said that tax-funded services should be cut to lower taxes.

See also
Florida House of Representatives

References

External links
Official Website
Sponsored Bills
Project VoteSmart
 St Petersburg Times (January 26, 2003) Peter Nehr for Tarpon Springs commission..

1952 births
St. Petersburg College alumni
Living people
Members of the Florida House of Representatives
People from Kapfenberg
People from Tarpon Springs, Florida
University of South Florida alumni
Austrian emigrants to the United States